Carlene Carter is the debut album by Carlene Carter, recorded in London with Graham Parker’s backing band, The Rumour.

Critical reception

K.A. Scott of AllMusic writes "By recording her debut album in England, Carlene Carter served notice that despite coming from a legendary American country music family, she intended to make her own way in the biz and establish her own musical identity."

Robert Christgau says, "This woman has a strong voice, an assertive persona, and good taste in bands (the Rumour) and grandmothers (Maybelle C.)."

Track listing

Musicians

Carlene Carter - vocals, piano, backing vocals
Andrew Bodnar - bass
Steve Goulding - drums
Brinsley Schwarz - electric, acoustic, and slide guitars, percussion, backing vocals
Bob Andrews - piano, backing vocals, Oberheim synthesizer, percussion, organ, electric piano, bass
Nick Lowe - bass, backing vocals
Graham Parker - acoustic guitar, backing vocal
Terry Williams - drums
Ray Bearis - tenor saxophone
Chris Gower - bass trombone
Dick Hanson - flugelhorn
John "Irish" Earle - baritone saxophone

Production

Produced by Bob Andrews and Brinsley Schwarz
Co-produced by Martyn Smith

Track information and credits verified from the album's liner notes.

References

External links
Carlene Carter Official Site
Warner Brothers Records Official Site

Carlene Carter albums
1978 debut albums
Warner Records albums